This is a list of films produced in Belarus:

1920s
 1926  Tale of the Woods or True Forest Story
 1927 Prostitute
 1928 Kastus Kalinovsky
 1928 His Excellency
 1929  See You Tomorrow

1930s
 1930 Hatred
 1933 The Return of Nathan Becker
 1933 The First Platoon
 1934 Lieutenant Kijé
 1936 Late for a Date
 1936 Seekers of Happiness
 1938 The Bear

1970s
 1975 The Adventures of Buratino
 1977 About Red Riding Hood

1980s
 1985 Come and See

1990s

 1990 Vanka-vstanka 
 1991 Med osy
 1992 Beloe ozero
 1992 Bez ulik 
 1992 Kooperativ Politbyuro ili budet dolgim proshchanie
 1992 Na tebya upovayu 
 1992 Russkoye shchastye 
 1992 
 1993 Az vozdam 
 1993 Chernyi aist 
 1993 Chertovy kukly 
 1993  
 1993 Istoki 
 1993 Keshka i biznes
 1993 
 1993 Khochu v Ameriku 
 1993 Me Ivan, You Abraham
 1993 Opoznanie 
 1993 Roman imperatora
 1994 Roman 'alla russa'  
 1994 
 1994 Tsvety provintsyi 
 1994 Zakoldovannyie
 1995 Igra voobrazheniya 
 1995 Lato milosci 
 1995 Peyzazh s tremya kupalshchitsami 
 1995 Syn za ottsa... 
 1996 Beg ot smerti
 1996 Drugoi 
 1996 From Hell to Hell 
 1996 Obyknovennyi prezident 
 1996 Vozvrashcheniye bronenostsa 
 1997 Botanicheskiy sad 
 1997 Zeezicht
 1998 Strakh 
 1999 Lyubit po-russki 3: Gubernator
 1999 Reyndzher iz atomnoy zony

2000s
	

 2001 V avguste 44-go 
 2001 Povodyr 
 2002 Desert Cemetery
 2002 Kavkazkie plenniki 
 2002 Prikovannyy 
 2002 Reportazh iz kletky dlya krolikov
 2003 Anastasia Slutskaya
 2003 Babiy Yar 
 2003 Chernobyl Heart
 2003 Kola (short film)
 2003 My zhivem na krai 
 2004 On the Nameless Height
 2004 Dunechka 
 2004 Mysterium Occupation
 2004 Prodolzheniye 
 2006 A Lesson of Belarusian (documentary film)
 2006 Franz + Polina 
 2006 Posledniy bronepoezd 
 2007 Shchit otechestva
 2009 Dneprovsiy rubezh

2010s
	

 2010 Fortress of War
 2010 Massacre
 2011 Belarusian Dream (documentary film)
 2012 Viva Belarus! 
 2012 In the Fog 
 2014 The Interrogation of Muscular P.O.W.

External links
 Belarusian film at the Internet Movie Database

Belarus
 
Films